Marcin Gawron (born 25 May 1988)  is a Polish tennis player. He made the final of the 2006 Wimbledon Junior Championship, but lost to Thiemo de Bakker 2–6, 6–7(4–7).

Junior Grand Slam finals

Singles: 1 (1 runner-up)

ATP Challenger and ITF Futures finals

Singles: 22 (8–14)

Doubles: 33 (19–14)

External links
 
 

1988 births
Living people
Polish male tennis players
Sportspeople from Nowy Sącz